Keld Nielsen (born 12 December 1957, in Copenhagen) is a former Danish handball player who competed in the 1984 Summer Olympics.

He played his club handball with SAGA (Samvirkets Atletik- og Gymnastik Afdeling). In 1984 he finished fourth with the Denmark men's national handball team in the 1984 Olympic tournament. He played five matches and scored eight goals.

References

1957 births
Living people
Danish male handball players
Olympic handball players of Denmark
Handball players at the 1984 Summer Olympics
Handball players from Copenhagen